Bucksport High School is a public high school in Bucksport, Maine, United States. It is part of Regional School Unit (RSU) 25. Between 350 and 400 students study at Bucksport High School. It also provides a satellite program on campus for Hancock County Technical Center.

References

Buildings and structures in Bucksport, Maine
Public high schools in Maine
Schools in Hancock County, Maine